Three points for a win is a standard used in many sports leagues and group tournaments, especially in association football, in which three points are awarded to the team winning a match, with no points awarded to the losing team.  If the game is drawn, each team receives one point.  Many leagues and competitions originally awarded two points for a win and one point for a draw, before switching to the three points for a win system. The change is significant in league tables, where teams typically play 30–40 games per season.  The system places additional value on wins compared to draws such that teams with a higher number of wins may rank higher in tables than teams with a lower number of wins but more draws.

Rationale 

"Three points for a win" is supposed to encourage more attacking play than "two points for a win", as teams will not settle for a draw if the prospect of gaining two extra points (by playing for a late winning goal) outweighs the prospect of losing one point by conceding a late goal to lose the match. A second rationale is that it may prevent collusion amongst teams needing only a draw to advance in a tournament or avoid relegation. A commentator has stated that it has resulted in more "positive, attacking play". However, critics suggest teams with a one-goal lead late in a match become more defensive in order to defend a lead. In addition, the overall competitive balance decreases in favor of top teams. The average number of goals per match in Turkey's top football division has risen significantly since the change to three points for a win.

The three-point system in ice hockey – in the Czech Republic, Finland, Germany, Russia, Switzerland and Sweden – had no effect on the number of goals scored. The same conclusion can be made for relative number of ties.

History
The system was proposed for the English Football League (then known as The Football League) by Jimmy Hill. It was introduced in England in 1981, but did not attract much use elsewhere until it was used in the 1994 World Cup finals. In 1995, FIFA formally adopted the system, and it subsequently became standard in international tournaments, as well as most national football leagues.

Year of adoption of three points for a win (association football)
This lists association football leagues where the standard is 3 points for a win in regulation time, one point for a draw, zero for a defeat. The year given is when the relevant season started.

 1981: England
 1982: Israel
 1983: New Zealand (NSL)
 1984: Iceland
 1986: Northern Ireland
 1987: Turkey, Hong Kong
 1988: Norway, Japan
 1990: Sweden, Georgia
 1991: Cyprus, Finland
 1992: Greece
 1993: Belgium (Div. 2), Bulgaria, Ireland, Italy (Serie C1 and Serie C2)
 1994: Croatia, Czech Republic, Estonia, France (after a trial in 1988–89), Hungary, Italy (Serie A and Serie B), Iran, Iraq (after a trial in 1984–85), Kazakhstan, Malta, Moldova, Romania, Scotland, Slovakia, South Korea, Ukraine, AFC (1994–95 Asian Club Championship), FIFA (1994 FIFA World Cup) and UEFA (UEFA Euro 1996 qualifying)
 1995: Argentina, Armenia, Austria, Azerbaijan, Belarus, Belgium (Div. 1), Brazil, Chile, China, Colombia, Denmark, Faroe Islands, Germany, Italy (Lega Nazionale Dilettanti), Latvia, Lithuania, Luxembourg, Mexico, Netherlands, Peru, Poland, Portugal, Russia, Slovenia, Spain, Switzerland, Uruguay, CONMEBOL (Copa América), CONMEBOL (Copa Libertadores) and UEFA (UEFA Champions League)
 1996: AFC (1996 AFC Asian Cup qualification), CAF (African Cup of Nations), UEFA (UEFA Euro 1996) and AFC (1996 AFC Asian Cup)
Major League Soccer, based in the United States and Canada, has awarded three points for a win since its first season of 1996, but initially held a penalty shootout at the end of regulation draws, awarding 1 point to the winner of the shootout and none to the loser. Since 2000, it has allowed ties/draws to stand in the regular season, and follows the international standard of awarding 1 point for a draw.

History in ice hockey
Many ice hockey leagues use the 3 points for a regulation win, 2 points for a overtime/shootout win, 1 point for overtime/shootout loss, 0 points for a regulation loss as a way to incentivize teams to win in regulation thus causing more attacking play. Listed below are the years that ice hockey leagues and associations have adopted and abandoned a 3 point for a win system.
1998: Germany (3 points for a regulation win, 2 points for a Overtime/Shootout win, 1 point for Overtime/Shootout loss, 0 points for a regulation loss)
1999: Sweden (3 points for a regulation win, 2 points for a Overtime/Shootout win, 1 point for Overtime/Shootout loss, 0 points for a regulation loss)
2000: Slovakia (3 points for regulation win, 2 points for a Overtime win, 1 point for a tie or overtime loss, 0 points for regulation loss)
2001: Russia (3 points for regulation win, 2 points for a Overtime win, 1 point for a tie or overtime loss, 0 points for regulation loss), Slovakia (abandonment)
2002: Slovakia (3 points for regulation win, 2 points for a Overtime win, 1 point for a tie, 0 points for regulation loss)
2004: Czechia,Slovakia(3 points for regulation win, 2 points for a Overtime win, 1 point for a tie or overtime loss, 0 points for regulation loss),Finland (3 points for a regulation win, 2 points for a Overtime/Shootout win, 1 point for Overtime/Shootout loss, 0 points for a regulation loss) 
2006: Switzerland, Czechia (3 points for a regulation win, 2 points for a Overtime/Shootout win, 0 points for any loss), Slovakia (3 points for a regulation win, 2 points for a Overtime win, 0 points for any loss)
2007: IIHF, Russia, Austria (3 points for a regulation win, 2 points for a Overtime/Shootout win, 1 point for Overtime/Shootout loss, 0 points for a regulation loss)
2008: Slovakia (3 points for a regulation win, 2 points for a Overtime/Shootout win, 1 point for Overtime/Shootout loss, 0 points for a regulation loss)
2009: USA Collegiate (3 points for a Regulation/Overtime win, 2 points for a Shootout win, 1 point for Shootout loss, 0 points for a Regulation/Overtime loss)
2015: France (3 points for a regulation win, 2 points for a Overtime/Shootout win, 1 point for Overtime/Shootout loss, 0 points for a regulation loss)
2018: Russia (abandonment)
NHL, KHL, and EIHL use the 2 points for any win, 1 point for overtime/shootout loss, 0 points for a regulation loss in hockey point system. These leagues however still recognize that their current point system does not initiative winning in regulation on its own. Instead of using the a three point system they instead initiative winning in regulation thought tiebreakers these leagues currently all have this tiebreaker system: 1) fewest number of games played; 2) Greater number of regulation wins.

Bandy
The Russian Bandy Super League currently uses the 3 point for a win, 1 point for a tie, 0 for a loss point system.

Field Hockey
Since 1998 FIH has used the 3 point for a win, 1 point for a tie, 0 for a loss point system.

Water Polo
The FINA Water Polo World League used the 3 points for a regulation win, 2 points for a Shootout win, 1 point for Shootout loss, 0 points for a regulation loss point system.

Camogie
The All-Ireland Senior Camogie Championship currently uses the 3 point for a win, 1 point for a tie, 0 for a loss point system.

Ladies' Gaelic football
The Ladies' Gaelic Football Association currently uses the 3 point for a win, 1 point for a tie, 0 for a loss point system for all competitions.

Volleyball
In FIVB competitions the point system is 3 points for winning in three or four sets, 2 points for winning in five sets, 1 point for losing in five sets, 0 points for losing in three or four sets.

Variants
In 1936 there kicked off the first USSR Championship in football among "exhibition teams" (later "teams of masters") instead of cities teams as previously and was conducted as a league's round-robin tournament. The points in tournament were awarded in a format three points for a win, but for a draw was awarded two points and a loss – one point, while no points were awarded for no show.

Some leagues have used shootout tiebreakers after drawn matches. Major League Soccer (1996–2000) used three points for a win, one point for a shootout win, no points for a shootout loss, none for a loss. The Norwegian First Division (in 1987) and the Campeonato Brasileiro Série A and its lower divisions (in 1988) used three points for a win, two points for a shootout win, one point for a shootout loss, none for a loss. The same system is adopted in the group stages of the 2016–17 EFL Trophy and 2016–17 Scottish League Cup onward (in both cases, no extra time will be played). The Iraqi Premier League has used two different variants of this system. The first was in the 1988–89 season, where three points were awarded for a win by two or more goals (after normal or extra time), two points were awarded for a one-goal win (after normal or extra time), one point was awarded for a penalty shootout win and zero points were awarded for penalty shootout defeats or defeats after normal or extra time. The second variant was used in the 1994–95 season, where three points were awarded for a one-goal or two-goal win, but four points were awarded for a win by three or more goals.

In the National Hockey League in North America, a system described as "the three point win" was proposed in 2004, with three points for a win in regulation time, two for a win in overtime, and one for a tie. This proposal was put on hold by the 2004–05 NHL lockout and subsequently rejected by team owners in February 2007. Instead the NHL awards two points for a win in regulation or overtime/shootout, one point for an overtime loss, and none for a regulation loss.

International competitions run by the International Ice Hockey Federation award three points for a win in regulation time and zero points for a loss.  Games in IIHF competitions are not allowed to end in ties; if a game is tied after regulation each team is awarded one point and a sudden-death overtime followed by a shootout (if necessary) is played, with the winner awarded an extra point (for a total of two points).

In 2009, the Central Collegiate Hockey Association adopted a system of three points for a regulation or overtime win, two for a shootout win, one for a shootout loss, and none for a regulation or overtime loss.  The IIHF uses a similar system for its competitions, awarding three points for a win in regulation, two points for a win in overtime or shootout, one point for a loss in overtime or shootout, and no points for a loss in regulation.

See also
Group tournament ranking system
Winning percentage

References

External links 
 NHL Standings Under Three Point System
 Guardian commentary 2009

Three points
Terminology used in multiple sports
Tournament systems